Trinity (Past, Present and Future) is the third studio album by Slum Village, released on August 13, 2002. The album was mainly produced by Jay Dee. Additional production was from Hi-Tek, Waajeed, Scott Storch, Karriem Riggins, T3, Black Milk, Young R.J., and Shelton "Ess" Rivers.

Overview 
Trinity marked the group's first shift away from its original lineup, due to J Dilla's departure following Fantastic, Vol. 2, to pursue a solo career.  Longtime affiliate Elzhi, joined the remaining members; a move which was initially disapproved by hardcore fans, but with time has been accepted, and even praised.

Another major change was Slum Village's new recording home, Capitol Records, which would subsequently cause problems for the group.  Although the first single "Tainted" was a respectable success, the album received poor promotion thereafter.

With the production element of Fantastic, Vol. 2 receiving the most acclaim the last time around, filling Dilla's shoes was always going to be a hard task for even the most competent trackmaster, but the team assorted for Trinity (including Dilla himself) didn't stray too far from the feel of the previous album.  The beats are, perhaps, less jazzy and subtle but even further left of field on tracks like the aptly titled "Insane", and the first of three Dilla contributions, "One".  The group's chemistry, while not as freeflowing and snappy as before, remained intact, and there seemed to be a more concentrated effort by each member to match each other's flows and subjects on the same songs.

While on tour to support the album, Baatin began to experience health problems, which led to a diagnosis of schizophrenia. He was soon kicked out of the group while still in the hospital, which greatly upset him. The dispute was later resolved, and Baatin reunited with T3 and Elzhi in 2008, before dying of a suspected drug overdose in 2009.

Critical reaction 
Fans were split between those welcoming the addition of Elzhi and those who were against it and felt that J Dilla was too instrumental in the group's previously established identity to be replaced.  Many critics, however, wrote favorable reviews and gave praise for the group's original song concepts as well as Elzhi's lyrical abilities.

Track listing
"Intro 1" (prod. by T3)  – 0:32
"Intro 2" (prod. by Waajeed)  – 2:26
"Insane" (prod. by Waajeed)  – 2:37
"What Is This?" (prod. by Black Milk)  – 2:25
"Tainted" (feat. Dwele) (prod. by Karriem Riggins)  – 4:26
"La La" (prod. by Waajeed)  – 4:52
"All-Ta-Ment" (prod. by T3)  – 3:42
"Disco" (prod. by T3) – 3:05
"Trinity" (prod. by Black Milk)  – 2:09
"One" (prod. by J Dilla)  – 3:50
"Hoes" (prod. by J Dilla)  – 3:28
"Star (Interlude)" (feat. T. Banks) (prod. by T3)  – 0:22
"Star" (feat. Dwele) (prod. by Waajeed)  – 3:20
"Slumber" (prod. by Hi-Tek)  – 4:10
"Let's" (prod. by J Dilla)  – 5:18
"S.O.U.L." (prod. by Karriem Riggins)  – 3:25
"80's Skit" (prod. by Slum Village)  – 1:48
"Unisex (Interlude)" (prod. by T3)  – 1:49
"Love U Hate" (prod. by Shelton "Ess" Rivers)  – 3:38
"Get Live" (prod. by Scott Storch) – 4:43
"Harmony" (prod. by Karriem Riggins)  – 3:28
"Who Are We? (Interlude)" (prod. by T3)   – 1:05
Fall In Love (feat. Samiyyah) (prod. by T3) – 1:35

Album singles

References

2002 albums
Slum Village albums
Albums produced by Scott Storch
Albums produced by J Dilla
Albums produced by Black Milk
Albums produced by Hi-Tek
Albums produced by Karriem Riggins
Capitol Records albums